The 1955 All-Ireland Senior Football Championship was the 69th staging of Ireland's premier Gaelic football knock-out competition.

Meath were the defending champions, however, they were defeated by Dublin in the Leinster final.

Kerry were the winners.

Note Quarter Finals were back in the Munster championship but Clare only skipped 1 year. Limerick, not part of the championship between 1953 and 1964, were approved to host Waterford in the Quarter Final but did not play them.

Results

Connacht Senior Football Championship

Leinster Senior Football Championship

Munster Senior Football Championship

Clare back in the Munster championship after 1 year break football again but even Limerick didn't take part between 1953 & 1964 there were approved to host Waterford in the Quarter Final but didn't take part.

Ulster Senior Football Championship

All-Ireland Senior Football Championship

Championship statistics

Miscellaneous

 Even though Limerick did not take part in the Munster football championship between 1953 and 1964, they were scheduled to host Waterford but failed. Clare returned to the championship after a skip year. 
 Markievicz Park, Sligo was named after a woman of the 1916 uprising called Constance Markievicz.
 Both of the All Ireland semi-finals end in a draw and go to a replay.
 Dublin win their first Leinster title since 1942 and reach their first All Ireland final since that same year but are narrowly beaten by Kerry.

References